AGC Studios is an American film and television production studio. It was founded and launched by Chairman and CEO Stuart Ford in February 2018 as a platform to develop, produce, finance and globally license a diverse portfolio of feature films, scripted, unscripted and factual television, digital and musical content from its dual headquarters in Los Angeles and London. The new studio’s Hollywood output has a wide-ranging multicultural focus, designed for exploitation across an array of global platforms including major studio partnerships, streaming platforms, traditional broadcast and cable television networks and independent distributors, both in the U.S. and internationally.

AGC Studios is initially backed by three key strategic investors: Latin American private asset management firm MediaNet Partners; Image Nation Abu Dhabi, one of the leading media and entertainment companies in the Arabic-speaking world; and leading Silicon Valley entrepreneur and chairman of Fibonacci Films, Greg Clark.

Filmography

2010s

2020s

Upcoming

Television
AGC Television is the television production and distribution division of Stuart Ford’s independent content studio AGC Studios.

Released

Upcoming

References

External links
 

Film production companies of the United States
Television production companies of the United States
Mass media companies established in 2018
Companies established in 2018
International sales agents